Patricio Cueva Jaramillo (28 December 1928 – 19 May 2010) was a Latin American painter and journalist.

Cueva was born in Cuenca. He was the second son of Carlos Cueva Tamaríz (1898–1991) and his wife Rosa Esther Jaramillo Montesinos. Cueva's family was middle-class; nevertheless his father was a distinguished politician and professor at the University of Cuenca. His youngest brother, Juan Cueva Jaramillo, was also a politician and diplomat.

He studied economics and political science in Paris and Prague in the late 1940s and early 1950s and later married and divorced the Ecuadorian ballet dancer Noralma Vera Arrata. He worked in Cuba as a journalist at the Granma where he met the young Gabriel García Marquez.

As a painter, the ecuadorian landscape was his most recurrent theme. His latest exhibition was in Quito, in the cultural centre of the Alliance française in July 2007.
Although a close friend of the painter Eduardo Kingman and his brother Nicolas, Cueva's work is not influenced by Kingman's famous Expressionist hands. They worked together at the Caspicara Gallery in Quito.

See also 
 La Hora

External links 
 Diario La Hora
 Article about his latest exhibition
 Diccionario Biografico del Ecuador
 Muere Patricio Cueva Jaramillo

1928 births
Ecuadorian painters
2010 deaths
People from Cuenca, Ecuador
Ecuadorian expatriates in France
Ecuadorian expatriates in Cuba
Ecuadorian expatriates in Czechoslovakia